Santiponce is a town located in the province of Seville, Spain. According to the 2006 census (INE), the town has a population of 7742 inhabitants.

The town contains the ruins of the Roman city Italica.

References

Municipalities of the Province of Seville